Minus is the second studio album by Australian music collective Dukes of Windsor, released on 5 September 2008.

Track listing

Charts

Release history

References

Dukes of Windsor albums
2008 albums